Witten Towhead is a bar island or "towhead" (river island) on the Ohio River in Tyler County, West Virginia. It is located to the southwest of Paden City. Witten Towhead is a part of the Ohio River Islands National Wildlife Refuge.

See also 
List of islands of West Virginia

Reference 

River islands of West Virginia
Islands of Tyler County, West Virginia
Islands of the Ohio River